Hong Kong Airport Services Limited (HAS) was founded in 1995 and began operations in July 1998 with the opening of Chek Lap Kok International Airport. It employs approximately 3,100 people and owns a fleet of over 3,000 ground-support equipment and vehicles. It is a wholly-owned subsidiary of Cathay Pacific, with offices located at Cathay City, Cathay House, Passenger Terminal Building and Cathay Pacific Cargo Terminal.

The company provides ground handling services to airline customers, which including loading and unloading of aircraft, baggage handling, cargo and mail delivery, ramp coordination, aircraft-load control, jet bridge and passenger steps operation, unit load device storage and crew transportation.

The company also handles passenger and flight-handling services such as passenger check-in, ticketing, flight dispatch, and cargo documentation. It provides passenger handling for 19 airlines, and ramp and cargo services for 24 airlines, servicing major local carriers Cathay Pacific Airways and Cathay Dragon. In 2016, the company had a market share of 19.73% in passenger handling services and 46.94% in ramp handling services at Hong Kong International Airport. It is a member of the International Air Transport Association Ground Handling Council.

History

Early beginning: 1995–2000 
In 1995, the Hong Kong Airport Services was founded as a joint venture between Cathay Pacific and Hong Kong Dragon Airlines, to serve the newly built Hong Kong International Airport in Chek Lap Kok, and provide ramp and cargo services to airlines operating in the Hong Kong. In 1996, the company won the franchise rights for aircraft ramp handling services and air side crew transportation services later in 1997. In 1998, it commenced services in the new Hong Kong International Airport.

Development and overseas expansion 
On 1 November 2008, the company integrated services with Dragon Air's ground handling company Hong Kong International Airport Services, soon after Cathay Pacific fully acquired Dragon Air.

On 1 December 2008, Cathay Pacific agreed to take the remaining stake of Hong Kong Airport Services, and it became a wholly owned subsidiary of Cathay Pacific. Since the acquisition, employees of Hong Kong Airport Services represented Cathay Dragon for the ground handling part.

In March 2012, Hong Kong Airport Services established a joint venture company, Shanghai International Airport Services Company, with Shanghai International Airport Company Limited, Air China, and Shanghai Airport Services to provide services in both Shanghai Pudong International Airport and Hongqiao Airport.

In late 2018, the company integrated services with Cathay Pacific ground services and are now representing Cathay Pacific in ground services.

See also 

 Airport Authority Hong Kong
 Cathay City
 Air China
 Chek Lap Kok International Airport
 Shanghai Pudong International Airport
 Hongqiao Airport

References

External links 
Official website

Aerospace companies of Hong Kong
Aircraft ground handling companies
Transport companies established in 1995
1995 establishments in Hong Kong
Hong Kong International Airport